This article lists the complete results of the knock out stage of the 2013 BWF World Junior Championships – Teams event in Bangkok, Thailand.

Bracket

Result

Quarter-finals

China vs Chinese Taipei

Indonesia vs Malaysia

Japan vs Thailand

South Korea vs Vietnam

Semi-final

China vs Indonesia

Japan vs South Korea

Bronze Medal Final

China vs Japan

Final

Indonesia vs South Korea

References

2013 BWF World Junior Championships
2013 in youth sport